Epiphanius of Petra, also called Epiphanius of Syria, was a sophist and rhetorician at Athens in the first half of the fourth century AD.

He is described as coming from Petra in Arabia by the Suda, a ninth-century Byzantine encyclopaedia, but as coming from Syria by Eunapius. This is not necessarily a contradiction, since urban Arabs frequently identified as Syrian. The Suda calls another sophist, Callinicus of Petra, both a Syrian and an Arabian. Epiphanius was the son of a certain Ulpian, probably not the same person as the sophist Ulpian of Antioch. He was a pupil of Julian of Cappadocia.

That Epiphanius was a pagan is known from an incident in Laodicea, where he was on close terms with two prominent local Christians, Apollinarius the Elder and his son, Apollinarius the Younger. Sometime between 328 and 335 they attended one of his lectures. According to custom, Epiphanius dismissed the "uninitiated and profane" (a cue to Christians to leave) before reciting a hymn to Dionysus. The Apollinarii were among some Christians who remained, for which Bishop Theodotus excommunicated them.

According to the Suda, Epiphanius taught rhetoric at Petra and Athens, where he succeeded Julian. Eunapius says that he only taught students from the east. He was at the height of his fame when Libanius arrived in Athens in 336. Although Libanius intended to study under him, some pupils of Diophantus the Arab forced him to join their master instead. Eunapius describes Epiphanius as skilled in the analysis of questions but week in discourse. Vindonius Anatolius considered him pedantically precise. His name appears paired with that of Genethlius of Petra in Zosimus' scholia on Demosthenes. Zosimus calls him "the theorist" and seems to have learned of Genethlius through his writings. There is also an allusion to Epiphanius in Menander's scholia on Demosthenes. He seems to have specialised in issue-theory (the framing of questions) and some fragments on this topic may be from his otherwise lost work On the Similarity and Difference of the Issues.

Epiphanius did not live to old age. He and his wife, who was renowned for her beauty, both died childless from blood poisoning. This happened many years before Eunapius arrived in Athens in 362. The Suda lists the works of Epiphanius as:
On the Similarity and Difference of the Issues
Progymnasmata
Declamations
Demarchs
Polemarchikos
epideictic speeches
miscellaneous theoretical investigations

Note

Bibliography

4th-century Arabs
4th-century Romans
Roman-era students in Athens
Ancient Greek rhetoricians
Ancient Greek educators
Roman-era Sophists
Arabs in the Roman Empire
Late-Roman-era pagans